Upper Mendi Rural LLG is a local-level government (LLG) of Southern Highlands Province, Papua New Guinea. The people living there speak at last 4 different languages: Tambul, Mendi, Ialibu and Engan. It has an estimated population of over 40,000 people.

Wards
01. Abua 1
02. Abua 2
03. Pongai
04. Wagia
05. Koen
06. Enep/Dimifa
07. Kuma 1
08. Kundaga
09. Birop 1
10. Birop 2
11. Birop 3
12. Karel 1
13. Karel 2
14. Kuma 2
15. Egari
16. Mogol
17. Kelta
18. Nene
19. Abua 3
20. Mungura
21. Sol
22. Kambai 1
23. Kambai 2
24. Waparaga
25. Komia 1
26. Komia 2
27. Yare
28. Semera

References

Local-level governments of Southern Highlands Province